Rafik Mhamdi is a Tunisian football manager.

References

Year of birth missing (living people)
Living people
Tunisian football managers
Étoile Sportive du Sahel managers
JS Kairouan managers
ES Hammam-Sousse managers
Tunisian Ligue Professionnelle 1 managers